Peel Slowly and See is a five-disc box set of material by the Velvet Underground. It was released in September 1995 by Polydor.

Compilation
The name of this box set comes from the instruction presented on vinyl copies of the band's debut album to peel back the banana sticker featured on the cover. The set includes all four studio albums by the Lou Reed-era line-ups of the Velvet Underground, alongside demo recordings and live performances, some of which had been previously bootlegged, and some of which had never before been released. Squeeze, recorded after Reed's departure from the band, is not included. The Velvet Underground, the band's self-titled third album, uses the "closet mix", Lou Reed's mix of the album that gives more emphasis to the vocals, and was the mix used on the original release. The band's fourth album, Loaded, is presented with "full-length versions" of three of its tracks, "Sweet Jane", "Rock & Roll" and "New Age".

Rolling Stone journalist David Fricke wrote extensive liner notes in an accompanying booklet, which also pictured many items of Velvet Underground memorabilia from the collection of guitarist Sterling Morrison.

Track listing
All tracks written by Lou Reed except as noted.

All tracks performed by the Velvet Underground except † by the Velvet Underground & Nico; and ‡ by Nico.

With the exception of "Prominent Men", the tracks on Disc One feature multiple takes of each song.

Personnel
The Velvet Underground
John Cale – bass guitar, viola, keyboards (discs 1–3); lead vocal on "The Gift" and "Lady Godiva's Operation"; organ and viola on disc 5, track 15
Sterling Morrison – guitar, bass guitar, backing vocals, co-vocal on "The Murder Mystery"
Lou Reed – vocals, guitar, piano, harmonica
Maureen Tucker – percussion (discs 2–5), lead vocal on "After Hours" and "I'm Sticking with You", co-vocal on "The Murder Mystery".
Doug Yule – bass guitar, keyboards, guitars, drums (disc 4–5); lead vocal on "Candy Says", "Who Loves the Sun", "New Age", "Lonesome Cowboy Bill", "Oh! Sweet Nuthin'", "Ride into the Sun" and "I'll Be Your Mirror" (live).

Additional musicians
Nico – lead vocal on "All Tomorrow's Parties" (both single and LP versions), "Femme Fatale", "I'll Be Your Mirror", "Melody Laughter", "It Was a Pleasure Then" and "Chelsea Girls"; backing vocals on "Sunday Morning"
Adrian Barber – drums on "Who Loves the Sun" and "I Found a Reason"
Tommy Castanaro – drums on "Cool It Down" and "Head Held High"
Billy Yule – drums on "Lonesome Cowboy Bill", "Oh! Sweet Nuthin'", "Ocean", "Some Kinda Love" (live) and "I'll Be Your Mirror" (live).

Boxset Design-Spencer Drate, Judith Salavetz, Sylvia Reed, Smayvision

Technical staff
The Velvet Underground – producers (disc 1; disc 3: 1–7, 14–16, disc 4, disc 5: 17–18)
Andy Warhol – producer (disc 2: 1–12)
The Velvet Underground & Nico – producers (disc 2: 13)
Tom Wilson – producer (disc 2: 14–15, disc 3: 8–13)
Geoff Haslam, Shel Kagan and The Velvet Underground – producers (disc 5: 1–10, 15–16)
Adrian Barber – producer (disc 5: 11–14, 19)
Brigid Polk – engineer (disc 5: 17–18)

References

Albums produced by John Cale
Albums produced by Lou Reed
Albums produced by Andy Warhol
Albums produced by Tom Wilson (record producer)
1995 live albums
1995 compilation albums
The Velvet Underground compilation albums
Polydor Records compilation albums
Polydor Records live albums